Martina Navratilova defeated Andrea Jaeger in the final, 6–3, 7–6(7–3) to win the singles tennis title at the 1981 Avon Championships. It was her third Tour Finals title, fifth singles title of the season, and 50th career singles title.

Tracy Austin was the defending champion, but did not qualify this year.

Seeds

Draw

Finals

Round robin

Group A

Q: qualifies to semifinals. PO: advances to play-off round. Allen takes 2nd place after defeating Mandlíková

Group B

Q: qualifies to semifinals. PO: advances to play-off round.

References
 Tournament Profile (ITF)
 Main Draw (WTA)

1981 WTA Tour
Singles